Get Up and Boogie (sometimes also known simply as Silver Convention) is the second studio album by the German disco group Silver Convention, and perhaps best known for including the song "Get Up and Boogie", which hit #1 on June 15, 1976 in Canada and reached #2 in the United States. Released in 1976, it proved popular on the dance floors and experienced some commercial success as well, reaching #9 on the Billboard Black Albums chart and #13 on the Billboard Pop Albums chart. Critical reception of the album, both back then and today, was mixed, although an Allmusic review called it "a respectable, if uneven, Euro-disco effort that boasts the disco smash 'Get Up and Boogie'". The album has since been released on iTunes in several countries, sometimes under the title Silver Convention.

Track listing

Personnel
Vocals – Penny McLean, Linda G. Thompson and Jackie Carter
Drums and Percussion – Keith Forsey and Martin Harrison
Bass – Gary Unwin
Keyboards – Sylvester Levay
Congas – Charlie Campbell
Strings arranged by Fritz Sonnleithner

Charts

Weekly charts

Year-end charts

Certifications

References

1976 albums
Silver Convention albums